Guillaume Raoux and Jan Siemerink were the defending champions, but Raoux did not compete this year. Siemerink teamed up with Leander Paes and reached the final before the tournament cancellation.

The final match between Leander Paes and Jan Siemerink versus Ellis Ferreira and David Rikl was cancelled due to rain. Both teams shared the prize money (USD $54,000 per team) and only won the corresponding points for reaching the final. The outcome allowed Leander Paes to take the World No. 1 in the Doubles ranking.

Seeds

Draw

Draw

References

External links
 Official Results Archive (ATP)
 Official Results Archive (ITF)

Rosmalen Grass Court Championships
1999 ATP Tour